Ian Millar, CM (born 6 January 1947) is a Canadian Equestrian Team athlete for show jumping. He is a two-time winner of the Show Jumping World Cup, and an Olympic silver medalist. Due to his longevity and accomplishments, he is often nicknamed "Captain Canada" in his sport. He holds the record for most Olympic appearances by any athlete in any sport (10). A member of Canada's 2012 Olympic Games team, he broke the record when he took part in his tenth Games in London 2012.

Biography
Millar was born in Halifax, Nova Scotia. He operates "Millar Brooke Farm" near the small town of Perth, Ontario, alongside his children Jonathon Millar and Amy Millar, and daughter-in-law Kelly Soleau-Millar. 

In 1986 he was made a Member of the Order of Canada, and in 1996 was inducted into the Canadian Sports Hall of Fame. In 2013, he was inducted into the Ontario Sports Hall of Fame.

He has a degree in business administration from Algonquin College, and received an honorary doctorate from the University of Guelph.

His wife Lynn died of cancer in March 2008.

Equestrian career
Millar is a twelve-time winner of the Canadian Show Jumping Championship. He has been a staple on the Canadian Equestrian Team for decades, and has amassed over $3.5 million in prize earnings at the prestigious Spruce Meadows venue in Calgary, Alberta.

With his horse, Big Ben (1976–1999), Millar won more than 40 Grand Prix titles worldwide and the Show Jumping World Cup two years in a row (1988 & 1989). At the Pan American Games in August 1987, Ian Millar became the second Canadian to win an individual gold medal. He now has nine Pan American Games medals, including two individual golds. He holds the North American record for Grand Prix and Derby wins. He was a member of every Canadian Equestrian Team at the Show Jumping World Championships from 1972 to 2014. At the 2012 Summer Olympics, Millar competed at his tenth games (his first having been in 1972, having only missed the 1980 Games due to the US-led boycott against the Soviet Union), breaking the record set by Hubert Raudaschl.

On 18 August, at the 2008 Summer Olympics in Beijing, at the age of 61, Millar anchored his team (also including Jill Henselwood, Eric Lamaze, and Mac Cone) to a first-place standing. Riding In Style, he completed a faultless round to lead the Canadian team into a jump-off for gold with the United States. Ultimately Canada would finish behind the American team to capture silver – Millar's first Olympic medal.

Millar was named to the 2012 Olympic team, making that appearance, his tenth, a record for any Olympic athlete's appearances at Olympics. In the 2012 Olympics' Individual Jumping event, Millar finished in a three-way tie for ninth aboard his gelding Star Power, the best Canadian result. In Team Jumping, Millar, along with fellow riders Jill Henselwood and Eric Lamaze, scored a fifth-place finish for Canada.

On 14 September 2014, Millar won the $1.5-million CP International at Spruce Meadows aboard Dixson, who shares bloodlines with Big Ben. This was the third time he had won the class, having won previously in 1987 and 1991 with Big Ben.

On 23 July 2015, Millar won a gold medal in the Pan American Games team jumping event.

On 1 May 2019, Millar announced his retirement from international competition to re-focus his attention on coaching and developing young horses.

International Championship Results

References

External links
 
 
 
 
 
 Athlete profile at London 2012 web site
 Ian Millar at The Canadian Encyclopedia
 Late-blooming Ian Millar just hitting his stride?
 Equestrian Sports at The Canadian Encyclopedia
 

Show jumping riders
Canadian show jumping riders
Canadian male equestrians
Olympic equestrians of Canada
Equestrians at the 1972 Summer Olympics
Equestrians at the 1976 Summer Olympics
Equestrians at the 1984 Summer Olympics
Equestrians at the 1988 Summer Olympics
Equestrians at the 1992 Summer Olympics
Equestrians at the 1996 Summer Olympics
Equestrians at the 2000 Summer Olympics
Equestrians at the 2004 Summer Olympics
Equestrians at the 2008 Summer Olympics
Equestrians at the 2012 Summer Olympics
Equestrians at the 1979 Pan American Games
Equestrians at the 1983 Pan American Games
Equestrians at the 1987 Pan American Games
Equestrians at the 1991 Pan American Games
Equestrians at the 1999 Pan American Games
Equestrians at the 2007 Pan American Games
Equestrians at the 2011 Pan American Games
Equestrians at the 2015 Pan American Games
Members of the Order of Canada
Medalists at the 2008 Summer Olympics
Olympic silver medalists for Canada
Olympic medalists in equestrian
Animal sportspeople from Ontario
Sportspeople from Ontario
Sportspeople from Halifax, Nova Scotia
People from Lanark County
Canadian people of Scottish descent
1947 births
Living people
Pan American Games gold medalists for Canada
Pan American Games silver medalists for Canada
Pan American Games bronze medalists for Canada
Pan American Games medalists in equestrian
Medalists at the 1987 Pan American Games
Medalists at the 1991 Pan American Games
Medalists at the 1999 Pan American Games
Medalists at the 2015 Pan American Games